Luciano Cardenali (born 30 June 1986 in Buenos Aires) is an Argentine footballer currently playing for León de Huánuco of the Peruvian First Division.

Teams
  Fénix 2009-2011
  León de Huánuco 2012–2014
  Independiente 2015
  Sportivo Las Parejas 2016
  Estudiantes 2016
  Unión F.C. 2017
  Juventud Unida 2019
  9 de Julio 2021

External links
 
Profile at Tenfield 

1986 births
Living people
Argentine footballers
Argentine expatriate footballers
Centro Atlético Fénix players
León de Huánuco footballers
Expatriate footballers in Peru
Expatriate footballers in Uruguay
Argentine expatriate sportspeople in Peru
Argentine expatriate sportspeople in Uruguay
Association footballers not categorized by position
Footballers from Buenos Aires